The Venetian is a 1958 Swedish television drama film directed by Ingmar Bergman, based on the 16th century Italian play La Venexiana written by an anonymous playwright.

Cast
 Maud Hansson – Nena, servant-girl
 Sture Lagerwall – Bernardo
 Gunnel Lindblom – Valeria
 Helena Reuterblad – Oria, Valeria's servant-girl
 Eva Stiberg – Angela
 Folke Sundquist – Julio

References

External links

1958 films
1950s Swedish-language films
1958 drama films
Swedish black-and-white films
Swedish television films
Films directed by Ingmar Bergman
Swedish drama films
1950s Swedish films